Kordabad (also Romanized as Kordābād) is a village in Ab Bar Rural District, in the Central District of Tarom County, Zanjan Province, Iran. At the 2006 census, its population was 39, in 9 families.

References 

Populated places in Tarom County